The following is a list of events and releases that happened in 2021 in music in the United States.

Notable events

January
8 – Olivia Rodrigo released her debut single, "Drivers License", which was met with critical acclaim and went on to break several records.
29 – Lia Ices released her first album in four years, Family Album.

February
5 – Foo Fighters released their first album in four years, Medicine at Midnight.
Terry Blade released his debut album American Descendant of Slavery, the Album.
7 – Eric Church and Jazmine Sullivan performed the national anthem, H.E.R. performed "America The Beautiful", and The Weeknd performed the halftime show during Super Bowl LV at Raymond James Stadium in Tampa, Florida.
12 – Jillette Johnson released her first album in four years, It's A Beautiful Day And I Love You.
 Robin Thicke released his first album in seven years, On Earth, and in Heaven.
 Taylor Swift released a re-recorded version of her 2008 single "Love Story", entitled "Love Story (Taylor's Version)". It is the lead single off Fearless (Taylor's Version), a re-recorded version of her second studio album. 
26 – Julien Baker released her first album in four years, Little Oblivions.
 NOFX released their first album in five years, Single Album.

March
5 – Tigers Jaw released their first album in four years, I Won't Care How You Remember Me.
 A Day to Remember released their first album in five years, You're Welcome.
 Chevelle released their first album in five years, Niratias. It was also their first album released as a duo following the departure of longtime bassist Dean Bernardini at the end of 2019.
 Kings of Leon released their first album in five years, When You See Yourself.
 The Spill Canvas released their first album in nine years, Conduit.
12 – Rob Zombie released his first album in five years, The Lunar Injection Kool Aid Eclipse Conspiracy.
 Nick Jonas released his first solo album in five years, Spaceman.
 Eyehategod released their first album in seven years, A History of Nomadic Behavior.
14 – The 63rd Annual Grammy Awards took place at the Los Angeles Convention Center. The Awards were originally scheduled for January 31, at the Staples Center but were pushed back due to escalating COVID-19 cases and health concerns in Los Angeles County. Beyoncé won the most awards with four. Billie Eilish won her second consecutive Record of the Year award for "Everything I Wanted", while Taylor Swift won her third Album of the Year award for Folklore.
19 – KSHMR released his debut album Harmonica Andromeda.
   Justin Bieber released his sixth album, Justice.
26 – Evanescence released their first album of all-original material in ten years, The Bitter Truth.
 Tomahawk released their first album in eight years, Tonic Immobility.
 The Juliana Theory released their first album in 16 years, A Dream Away.
 Adrian Smith (Iron Maiden) and Richie Kotzen (The Winery Dogs) released their self titled debut album, Smith/Kotzen.

April
2 – Demi Lovato released their first album in four years, Dancing with the Devil... the Art of Starting Over.
9 – Taylor Swift released Fearless (Taylor's Version), a re-recorded version of her 2008 album of the same name. Swift had announced her intention to re-record her first six studio albums after her master recordings were sold to Scooter Braun. The album became the first ever re-recorded album to top the US Billboard 200 chart.
 Rapper DMX died at the age of 50, one week after suffering a heart attack from a drug overdose.
16 – Cannibal Corpse released their first album in four years, Violence Unimagined.
 Liquid Tension Experiment released their first album in 22 years, Liquid Tension Experiment 3.
 The Offspring released their first album in nine years, Let the Bad Times Roll. It is also their first album without original bassist Greg K., who was fired from the band in 2018, and their last album with drummer Pete Parada who was ejected from the band in August 2021.
18 – The 56th Academy of Country Music Awards took place at various locations in Nashville.
23 – Porter Robinson released his sophomore album, and also his first in seven years, Nurture.
 Dinosaur Jr. released their first album in five years, Sweep It Into Space.
30 – Flotsam and Jetsam was scheduled to begin their Demolition of North America tour at the Club Red in Tempe, Arizona; this tour had previously been postponed from 2020 to this year, due to the COVID-19 pandemic, but was later put on hold until further notice. A new album, Blood in the Water, previously expected to coincide with the tour, was released on June 4.
 Manchester Orchestra released their first album in four years, The Million Masks of God.
 Dropkick Murphys released their first album in four years, Turn Up That Dial.
 Shelley, formerly DRAM, released his first album in five years, Shelley FKA DRAM.

May
7 – Travis Tritt released his first album in fourteen years, Set in Stone.
14 – Alan Jackson released his first album in six years, Where Have You Gone.
21 – Blake Shelton released his first album in four years, Body Language.
 Olivia Rodrigo's debut album, Sour, was released to critical acclaim and commercial success.
23 – The Billboard Music Awards took place in Los Angeles.
 Chayce Beckham won the nineteenth season of American Idol. Willie Spence was named runner-up.
24 – Megadeth parted ways with its co-founder, bassist David Ellefson, following accusations of sexual misconduct on his part. Ellefson denied the allegations as false and is currently pursuing charges and a defamation lawsuit against the accuser. The woman involved also made a statement denying the allegations.
25 – Cam Anthony won the twentieth season of The Voice. Kenzie Wheeler was named runner-up. Jordan Matthew Young, Rachel Mac, and Victor Solomon finished third, fourth, and fifth place respectively.
28 – DMX's first album in nine years, Exodus, was released following his death in April.

June
4 – Rise Against released their first album in four years, Nowhere Generation.
 – Atreyu released Baptize, their first album without co-frontman Alex Varkatzas (who left in 2020), and also with Brandon Saller moving away from the drums to focus only on vocals.
 – Lloyd Banks released his first album in 11 years, The Course of the Inevitable.
 – Liz Phair released her first album in 11 years, Soberish.
9 — The CMT Music Awards took place in Nashville. Kane Brown and Kelsea Ballerini hosts.
11 – AFI released their first album in four years, Bodies.
 – Azure Ray released their first album in 11 years, Remedy.
 – Garbage released their first album in five years, No Gods No Masters.
 – Maroon 5 released their first album in four years, Jordi.
18 – Fear Factory released their first album in six years, Aggression Continuum. It is their first studio album released following former vocalist Burton C. Bell's departure from the previous year, though his vocals from the album's 2017 sessions are still present.
25 –  Gary Allan released his first album in eight years, Ruthless.
Modest Mouse released their first album in six years, The Golden Casket.

July
9 – The Wallflowers released their first album in nine years, Exit Wounds.
16 – Caveman released their first album in five years, Smash.
 – John Mayer released his first album in four years, Sob Rock.
23 – Descendents released their first album in five years, 9th & Walnut.
 - Dave Matthews Band embarked on their 2021 Summer Tour, playing the first show in Raleigh, NC.
24 - Green Day, Fall Out Boy, and Weezer kicked off the Hella Mega Tour, which had been postponed from 2020 due to the COVID-19 pandemic.
30 – Jack Antonoff's project Bleachers released its first album in four years, Take the Sadness Out of Saturday Night.
 – Isaiah Rashad released his first album in five years, The House Is Burning.
 – Billie Eilish released her sophomore album, Happier Than Ever.

August
6 – Willy Mason released his first album in eight years, Already Dead.
 Billy Currington released his first album in six years, Intuition.
13 – Quicksand released their first album in four years, Distant Populations.
18 – Kiss resumed their End of the Road World Tour at Xfinity Center in Mansfield, Massachusetts, following 17 months of postponement due to the COVID-19 pandemic.
20 – Connie Smith released her first album in ten years, The Cry of The Heart.
 James McMurtry released his first album in six years, The Horses and the Hounds.
27 – OneRepublic released their first album in five years, Human.

September
3 – Molly Lewis released her first album in six years, The Forgotten Edge.
10 – Sleigh Bells released their first album in five years, Texis.
12 – The 2021 MTV Video Music Awards took place at the Barclays Center in Brooklyn, New York.
17 – Candlebox released their first album in five years, Wolves.
17 – ZillaKami released his debut album, DOG BOY.
24 – Angels & Airwaves released their first album in seven years, Lifeforms.

October
 12 – Smash Mouth singer Steve Harwell announced his retirement from the band to focus on his health following an erratic performance at the Big Sip festival in Bethel, New York.
 15 – Kelly Clarkson released her first album in four years, When Christmas Comes Around....
Gemini Syndrome released their first album in five years, 3rd Degree - The Raising.
 19 – The 52nd GMA Dove Awards were held at the  Allen Arena located in Nashville, Tennessee. Steven Furtick led the non-artist nominations with ten nominations, whilst Elevation Worship and Brandon Lake led the artist nominations with seven each.
 22 – Fuel released their first album in seven years, Anomaly. It is their first album to feature new lead singer John Corsale, following the second departure of original lead singer Brett Scallions. Co-founding member Carl Bell made his return on this album for the first time since 2007's Angels & Devils, and drummer Kevin Miller appeared for the first time since 2003's Natural Selection.
 Every Time I Die released their first album in five years, Radical.
 Together Pangea released their first album in eleven years, Dye.
 29 – Mastodon released their first album in four years, Hushed and Grim.
 The War on Drugs released their first album in four years, I Don't Live Here Anymore.
 Tori Amos released her first album in four years, Ocean to Ocean.
 31 – Limp Bizkit released their first album in ten years, Still Sucks.

November
10 - The Country Music Association Awards took place at the Bridgestone Arena in Nashville; Luke Bryan hosts.
12 – Taylor Swift released her second re-recorded album, Red (Taylor's Version), a freshly recorded issue of her 2012 studio album, Red.
 Silk Sonic, consisting of Bruno Mars and Anderson .Paak, released their debut album, An Evening with Silk Sonic. It was Mars' first album in five years.
 Walk the Moon released their first album in four years, Heights. It was their first album recorded as a trio after the band parted ways with bassist Kevin Ray in 2020.
19 – Exodus released their first studio album in seven years, Persona Non Grata.
 Converge and Chelsea Wolfe released their collaborative album, Bloodmoon: I. It was Converge's first album in four years.
21 – The American Music Awards took place at the Microsoft Theatre in Los Angeles. BTS, Doja Cat and Megan Thee Stallion took home the most awards with three each.
26 – Marvin Peterson reissued his live album, In Concert.
 Cynic released their first album in seven years, Ascension Codes. It was their first release since the 2020 deaths of bassist Sean Malone and former founding drummer Sean Reinert.

December
10 – Marie Osmond released her first album in five years, Unexpected.
14 – Girl Named Tom won the twenty-first season of The Voice. Wendy Moten was named runner-up. Paris Winningham, Hailey Mia, and Jershika Maple finished third, fourth, and fifth place respectively.
17 – John Dwyer released his first album in fifteen years, Gong Splat
31 – Mourning Noise released their compilation album Mourning Noise

Bands formed
Silk Sonic

Bands reformed
7 Seconds
Big Time Rush
The Bravery
Crossbreed
Element Eighty
Mudvayne
New Radicals
The Summer Set

Bands disbanded
Beach Slang
Jack Blanchard & Misty Morgan
Fat Boys
Hollywood Monsters
Rascal Flatts
Return to Forever

Albums released in 2021

January

February

March

April

May

June

July

August

September

October

November

December

Top songs on record

Billboard Hot 100 No. 1 Songs
"All I Want for Christmas Is You" – Mariah Carey 
"All Too Well (Taylor's Version)" – Taylor Swift 
"Butter" – BTS 
"Drivers License" – Olivia Rodrigo 
"Easy on Me" – Adele 
"Good 4 U" – Olivia Rodrigo 
"Industry Baby" – Lil Nas X and Jack Harlow 
"Leave the Door Open" – Silk Sonic, Bruno Mars and Anderson .Paak 
"Mood" – 24kGoldn feat. Iann Dior 
"Montero (Call Me by Your Name)" – Lil Nas X 
"My Universe" – Coldplay and BTS 
"Peaches" – Justin Bieber feat. Daniel Caesar and Giveon 
"Permission to Dance" – BTS 
"Rapstar" – Polo G 
"Save Your Tears" – The Weeknd and Ariana Grande 
"Stay" – The Kid Laroi and Justin Bieber 
"Up" – Cardi B 
"Way 2 Sexy" – Drake feat. Future and Young Thug 
"What's Next" – Drake

Billboard Hot 100 Top 20 Hits
All songs that reached the Top 20 on the Billboard Hot 100 chart during the year, complete with peak chart placement.

Deaths
January 1 – Misty Morgan, 75, country music singer 
January 7 – 
Deezer D, 55, rapper, singer 
Jamie O'Hara, 70, country music singer, songwriter 
January 8 – Ed Bruce, 81, country music singer, songwriter 
January 11 – 
Howard Johnson, 79, jazz musician
Don Miller, 80, pop singer
January 13 –
Tim Bogert, 76, rock bassist
Duke Bootee, 69, rapper, producer and songwriter
Sylvain Sylvain, 69, glam rock guitarist
January 14 –
Duranice Paice, 62, gospel singer
Larry Willoughby, 73, country music singer, songwriter
January 16 –
Jason Cope, 43, country music guitarist
Phil Spector, 81, record producer, pop musician and songwriter
January 17 –
Junior Mance, 92, jazz pianist
Sammy Nestico, 96, jazz composer and arranger 
January 18 – Jimmie Rodgers, 87, pop singer
January 21 – Randy Parton, 67, country music singer, songwriter
January 22 – James Purify, 76, R&B singer (James & Bobby Purify)
January 24 – Tom Stevens, 64, alternative country music bassist
January 29 – Grady Gaines, 86, blues saxophonist 
January 30 – Double K, 43, rapper (People Under the Stairs)
February 2 – Aaron Wegelin, indie rock drummer
February 3 –
Anne Feeney, 69, folk singer-songwriter 
Jim Weatherly, 77, pop and country singer, songwriter 
February 4 – 
Matt Harris, power pop bassist
Nolan Porter, 71, R&B singer-songwriter
Gil Saunders, soul singer
February 5 – Douglas Miller, 71, gospel singer
February 7 – Elliot Mazer, 79, record producer and audio engineer
February 8 – Mary Wilson, 76, soul singer (The Supremes)
February 9 – 
Chick Corea, 79, jazz keyboardist and composer
Cedrick Cotton, 46, R&B singer
February 10 – Lee Sexton, 92, bluegrass banjoist
February 12 – Milford Graves, 79, jazz drummer 
February 14 – Ari Gold, 47, R&B singer
February 16 – Carman, 65, contemporary Christian singer
February 18 – 
Prince Markie Dee, 52, rapper (The Fat Boys)
Miles Seaton, 41, indie rock singer
February 19 –
James Burke, 70, soul singer
Jerold Ottley, 86, choral conductor
February 20 – Gene Taylor, 68, rock keyboardist
February 26 – Bob James, 68, hard rock singer
February 28 – Ian North, 68, power pop singer and guitarist
March 1 – Ralph Peterson Jr., 58, jazz drummer
March 2 – Mark Goffeney, 51, rock bassist
March 3 – Duffy Jackson, 67, jazz drummer
March 4 – Barbara Ess, 72, post-punk multi-instrumentalist
March 5 – Michael Stanley, 72, rock singer-songwriter and guitarist
March 11 – 
Ray Campi, 86, rockabilly musician
Jewlia Eisenberg, 50, avant-rock singer
March 14 – 
Reggie Warren, 52, R&B singer
Taylor Dee, 33, country music singer
March 17 – 
Matt Miller, 34, indie rock keyboardist
Freddie Redd, 92, jazz keyboardist
Corey Steger, 42, metalcore guitarist
March 18 – Paul Jackson, 73, jazz fusion bassist
March 19 – Gary Leib, 65, new wave keyboardist
March 20 – Dan Sartain, 39, garage rock and rockabilly singer-songwriter
March 23 – Don Heffington, 70, roots rock drummer
March 25 – Tavish Maloney, 24, emo guitarist
March 26 – Brett Bradshaw, 50, glam metal drummer
April 2 – Morris Dickerson, 71, funk bassist and singer
April 9 – DMX, 50, rapper, songwriter and actor
April 10 – Bob Petric, indie rock guitarist
April 14 – Rusty Young, 75, country rock singer-songwriter and guitarist
April 16 – Mike Mitchell, 77, rock guitarist
April 17 – Black Rob, 51, rapper
April 18 – Paul Oscher, 71, blues singer 
April 19 – Jim Steinman, 73, rock lyricist, composer, pianist, and record producer
April 21 – Joe Long, 88, pop rock bassist
April 23 – Shock G, 57, rapper (Digital Underground)
April 25 – Denny Freeman, 76, blues guitarist
April 29 –
Johnny Crawford, 75, pop singer
Tony Markellis, 68, jam band bassist
Will Mecum, 48, stoner rock guitarist
April 30 – John Dee Holeman, 92, Piedmont blues guitarist, singer, songwriter 
May 1 – Wondress Hutchinson, 56, dance singer
May 2 – Tommy West, 78, music producer and singer-songwriter
May 3 – Lloyd Price, 88, singer-songwriter and businessman
May 6 – Pervis Staples, 85, gospel singer
May 8 – Curtis Fuller, 86, jazz trombonist
May 13 – 
Norman Simmons, 91, jazz pianist and arranger
Jack Terricloth, 50, dark cabaret singer
Bill Tsamis, 60, metal guitarist  
May 15 – Mario Pavone, 80, jazz pianist
May 16 – Patsy Bruce, 81, country songwriter
May 17 – Neal Ford, 78, psychedelic rock singer
May 19 – Alix Dobkin, 80, folk singer-songwriter and guitarist
May 20 – Roger Hawkins, 75, rock and soul drummer
May 24 –
John Davis, 66, dance pop music singer
Samuel E. Wright, 74, pop singer and actor
May 29 - 
B.J. Thomas, 78, rock and pop singer
Johnny Trudell, 82, jazz trumpeter
May 31 – Lil Loaded, 20, rapper
June 3 – Karla Burns, 66, opera singer
June 7 – David C. Lewis, soft rock and new age keyboardist
June 8 – Dean Parrish, 79, soul singer
June 9 – Juan Nelson, 62, blues rock bassist
June 18 – Gift of Gab, 50, rapper (Blackalicious)
June 20 – 
Gianna Rolandi, 68, opera singer
Jeanne Lamon, 71, violinist and conductor
June 23 – Ellen McIlwaine, 75, psychedelic rock and blues singer, guitarist 
June 26 –
Jon Hassell, 84, jazz trumpeter 
Johnny Solinger, 55, hard rock singer (Skid Row)
June 28 – Burton Greene, 84, free jazz pianist
July 1 – Bryan St. Pere, 52, alternative rock drummer
July 4 – Sanford Clark, 85, rockabilly singer
July 9 – Andrew Williams, 49, Christian rock drummer
July 10 –
Byron Berline, 77, bluegrass fiddler
Chris Hutka, 35, post-hardcore singer
July 11 – Juini Booth, 73, jazz bassist
July 14 –
Gary Corbett, 63, blues rock keyboardist
Jeff LaBar, 58, glam metal and blues rock guitarist (Cinderella)
July 16 – Biz Markie, 57, rapper
July 17 – Robby Steinhardt, 71, progressive rock singer and violinist (Kansas)
July 19 – Chuck E. Weiss, 76, blues rock singer-songwriter
July 21 – Clarence McDonald, 76, pianist, composer, arranger and producer
July 25 – Count M'Butu, 75, blues rock percussionist (The Derek Trucks Band)
July 26 – 
Joey Jordison, 46, heavy metal drummer (Slipknot)
Mike Howe, 55, heavy metal singer
July 27 – Willie Winfield, 91, doo-wop singer 
July 28 – Dusty Hill, 72, rock singer and bassist (ZZ Top)
July 29 – Gonzoe, 45, rapper (Kausion)
August 1 – Paul Cotton, 78, country rock singer
August 3 – Kelli Hand, 56, techno DJ
August 4 – 
Razzy Bailey, 82, country singer
Paul Johnson, 50, house DJ
August 7 – Dennis Johnson, 70, saxophonist
August 9 – Chucky Thompson, 53, record producer
August 11 –
Mike Finnigan, 76, rock and jazz keyboardist  
Roy Gaines, 83, electric blues guitarist
Caroline Peyton, 69, folk singer songwriter
August 12 – Ronnell Bright, 91, jazz pianist
August 13 –
Baba Zumbi, 49, rapper 
Nanci Griffith, 68, folk singer songwriter
August 17 – Squeak, 26, hip hop producer
August 20 –
Tom T. Hall, 85, country singer songwriter
Larry Harlow, 82, salsa keyboardist
Michael Morgan, 64, classical conductor
August 21 –
Bill Emerson, 83, bluegrass banjoist 
Don Everly, 84, country-rock singer and songwriter (The Everly Brothers)
August 22 – Eric Wagner, doom metal singer
August 26 – Kenny Malone, 83, country music drummer
August 29 –
John Drake, 74, rock singer
Ron Bushy, 79, psychedelic rock drummer
August 30 – Lee Williams, 75, gospel singer
September 1 – Carol Fran, 87, soul blues singer and pianist
September 5 – Rickie Lee Reynolds, 72, rock guitarist
September 7 – Warren Storm, 84, swamp pop singer and drummer
September 8 – Susan Anway, 70, indie rock singer
September 12 – Don Maddox, 90, country singer
September 13 – George Wein, 95, jazz pianist
September 15 – Leonard Gibbs, 73, jazz percussionist
September 16 – Jane Powell, 92, pop singer
September 20 –
Sarah Dash, 76, R&B and funk singer
Warner Williams, 91, blues guitarist
September 22 – Bob Moore, 88, country music bassist
September 23 – Sue Thompson, 96, pop and country singer
September 24 – Pee Wee Ellis, 80, jazz and soul saxophonist
September 26 – George Frayne IV, 77, country rock singer and keyboardist
September 27 – Andrea Martin, 49, R&B singer and songwriter
September 28 –
Karan Armstrong, 79, opera soprano
Lonnie Smith, 79, jazz organist
September 29 – Mike Renzi, 80, jazz pianist and conductor
September 30 – Carlisle Floyd, 95, opera composer
October 1 – Raymond Gniewek, 89, classical violinist
October 8 – Jem Targal, 74, psychedelic rock bassist
October 9 – Dee Pop, 65, post-punk drummer
October 11 – Deon Estus, 65, R&B bassist and singer
October 14 –
Emani 22, 22, R&B singer 
Phil Leadbetter, 59, bluegrass resonator guitarist
Tom Morey, 86, jazz drummer
October 15 – Regi Hargis, 70, funk guitarist and singer
October 16 – Ron Tutt, 83, rock drummer
October 17 – Bruce Gaston, 74, classical instrumentalist
October 21 –
Tommy DeBarge, 64, funk bassist and singer
Robin McNamara, 74, pop rock singer-songwriter
October 22 – Jay Black, 82, pop rock singer
October 24 –
Willie Cobbs, 89, blues singer and harmonica player
Sonny Osborne, 83, bluegrass banjoist
October 26 – Rose Lee Maphis, 98, country singer
October 27 – William Shelby, 65, funk keyboardist
November 1 –
Emmett Chapman, 85, jazz guitarist
Pat Martino, 77, jazz guitarist
November 2 – Ronnie Wilson, 73, funk instrumentalist
November 8 – Margo Guryan, pop singer-songwriter
November 10 – Mike Gresema, 56, hard rock drummer
November 11 – John Goodsall, 68, progressive rock and jazz guitarist
November 13 – Philip Margo, 79, doo-wop singer
November 17 – 
Young Dolph, 36, rapper
Keith Allison, 79, garage rock bassist
Dave Frishberg, 88, jazz pianist and songwriter
November 18 − Slide Hampton, 89, jazz trombonist
November 20 − Billy Hinsche, 70, pop singer, guitarist and keyboardist
November 21 − Yul Anderson, 63, blues and gospel singer, guitarist and pianist
November 22 − Joanne Shenandoah, 63, folk singer-songwriter and guitarist
November 24 − Marilyn McLeod, 82, R&B singer and songwriter
November 26 − Stephen Sondheim, 91, film and theater composer and lyricist
December 1 – Alvin Lucier, 90, experimental composer and sound artist
December 4 − Stonewall Jackson, 89, country music singer
December 7 − Greg Tate, 63, multi-genre guitarist and music critic
December 8 − 
Gil Bridges, 80, rock saxophonist
Barry Harris, 91, jazz pianist
Ralph Tavares, 79, R&B singer
December 9 − David Lasley, 74, pop and R&B singer
December 10 − Michael Nesmith, 78, rock and country singer, songwriter and guitarist (The Monkees)
December 13 − Joe Simon, 85, R&B and soul singer
December 15 − Hub, 62, hip hop bassist (The Roots)
December 16 − Wanda Young, 78, R&B singer 
December 18 − Kangol Kid, 55, rapper (UTFO)
December 19 − Drakeo the Ruler, 28, rapper
December 20 − Paul Mitchell, 53, R&B singer
December 24 − J.D. Crowe, 84, bluegrass banjo player
December 25 − Tiffini Hale, 54, pop singer (The Party)
December 30 − Stephen J. Lawrence, 82, television composer

See also
2021 in music

References